Henry W. Bloch School of Management (formerly known as Henry W. Bloch School of Business and Public Administration) is an AACSB accredited business school founded in 1952 at the University of Missouri-Kansas City in Kansas City, Missouri. It offers undergraduate and graduate degrees in Business, Accounting and Public Administration. It is named after Alumnus Henry W. Bloch, founder of H&R Block. The Bloch School also offers NASPAA accredited degrees in Public administration.

Rankings

The school's Executive MBA was ranked once by Financial Times and the Master of Public Administration (MPA) in Non-Profit Management is ranked among the top 25 of the United States by U.S. News & World Report. As one of the most entrepreneurial schools in the nation,

In 2012, the Journal of Product Innovation Management published a study that ranked the school number 1 in the world for research in innovation management. However, the methodology of the study and the independence of its authors was questioned. In March, 2015, the journal published an "expression of concern" regarding the study.

The School is also home to a number of centers and institutes such as the L.P. Cookingham Institute of Urban Affairs and the Midwest Center for Nonprofit Leadership.

See also
 University of Missouri–Kansas City
 Missouri University System
 UMKC Law School
 UMKC School of Medicine

References

External links
 

Business schools in Missouri
Educational institutions established in 1952
University of Missouri–Kansas City
1952 establishments in Missouri